is a passenger railway station located in the town of Kuroshio, Hata District, Kōchi Prefecture, Japan. It is operated by the Tosa Kuroshio Railway and has the station number "TK34".

Lines and services

Layout
The station, which is unmanned, consists of a side platform serving a single track located on a hillside and is reached by a flight of steps from the access road. There is a shelter on the platform for waiting passengers. A parking area, bike shed, and a public telephone call box is at the base of the stairs.

Adjacent stations

|-
!colspan=5|Tosa Kuroshio Railway

History
The station opened on 1 October 1970 under the control of Japanese National Railways (JNR). After the privatization of JNR, control of the station passed to Tosa Kuroshio Railway on 1 April 1988.

Passenger statistics
In fiscal 2011, the station was used by an average of 25 passengers daily.

Surrounding area
The settlement surrounding the station is shown on maps as Kamikawaguchi and is part of the town of Kuroshio.
National Route 56 runs parallel to the track along the coast about 250 metres away.
Kamikawaguchi Harbour - a departure point for whale watching excursions.
Kamikawaguchi Harbour Whale Park - this recreational area is located next to the harbour.
Hata Youth Centre (幡多青少年の家) - the recreational facility is mentioned on the station nameboard but the next station  is actually nearer.

See also
 List of Railway Stations in Japan

References

External links

Railway stations in Kōchi Prefecture
Railway stations in Japan opened in 1970
Kuroshio, Kōchi